Monilea is a genus of sea snails in the family Trochidae, the top snails.

Description
The solid shell has a depressed-conical shape. The outer surface is sharply, spirally striate and closely obliquely striated . The shell has a more or less
developed callous ridge or funicle revolving on the inner side of the whorl within the umbilicus, and terminating at the columella, the edge of which is reflexed over it. The sinuous columella terminates in a point or denticle at its base. The outer lip is lirate within.

Distribution
The habitat of most species is in the Indian Ocean, but some occur in the Pacific Ocean.

Species
Species within the genus Monilea include:
 Monilea belcheri (Philippi, 1849)
 Monilea callifera (Lamarck, 1822), the type species
 Monilea carmesina (Webster G.H., 1908)
 Monilea chiliarches Melvill, 1910
 Monilea cocoa Okutani, 2001
 Monilea discerna (Iredale, 1937): (synonym: Talopena discerna Iredale, 1937)
 Monilea gloriola (Iredale, 1929)
 † Monilea grantmackiei Hayward, 1981 
 Monilea incerta Iredale, 1912
 Monilea lentiginosa (A. Adams, 1853) 
 Monilea lifuana (Fischer, 1878)
 Monilea pantanellii (Caramagna, 1888)
 Monilea patricia (Philippi, 1851)
 Monilea philippii A. Adams, 1855
 Monilea simulans Smith, 1899
 Monilea smithi (Wood, 1828)

The Indo-Pacific Molluscan Database also includes the following names in current use 
 Monilea calyculus (Wood, 1828)
 Monilea celebensis Schepman, 1908
 Monilea pudibunda Fischer, 1878
 Monilea rosea Tenison-Woods, 1876
 Monilea solanderi (Philippi, 1851)
 Monilea turbinata Tenison-Woods, 1877
 Monilea unicarinata (Fischer, 1879)

Species brought into synonymy
 Subgenus Monilea (Priotrochus) Fischer, 1880: synonym of Priotrochus P. Fischer, 1879
 Monilea apicina Gould, 1861; synonym of Parminolia apicina (Gould, 1861)  
 Monilea chrysolamea (Martens, 1880): synonym of Priotrochus goudoti (Fischer, 1878)
 Monilea corrugata A. Adams, 1854: synonym of Monilea lentiginosa (A. Adams, 1853) 
 Monilea degregorii (Caramagna, 1888): synonym of Ethminolia degregorii (Caramagna, 1888)
 Monilea goudoti (P. Fisher, 1878): synonym of Priotrochus goudoti (Fischer, 1878)
 Monilea kalisoma A. Adams, 1853 (?): synonym of Monilea patricia (Philippi, 1851) 
 Monilea laevissima (Martens, 1881): synonym of Ilanga laevissima (Martens, 1881)
 Monilea morti (Iredale, 1929): synonym of Monilea lentiginosa (A. Adams, 1853)
 Monilea nucleus (Philippi, 1849): synonym of Rossiteria nucleus (Philippi, 1849) 
 Monilea obscura (Wood, 1828): synonym of Priotrochus obscurus (W. Wood, 1828)
 Monilea oleacea Hedley & Petterd, 1906: synonym of Archiminolia oleacea (Hedley & Petterd, 1906)
 Monilea philippensis (Watson, 1881): synonym of Spectamen philippense (Watson, 1881)
 Monilea ponsonbyi (G.B. Sowerby, 1888)  synonym of Priotrochus obscurus ponsonbyi (G.B. sowerby, 1888)
 Monilea rhodomphala (Souverbie in Souverbie & Montrouzier, 1875): synonym of Trochus rhodomphalus Souverbie in Souverbie & Montrouzier, 1875 (species inquirenda)
 Monilea rotundata Sowerby III, 1894: synonym of Minolia rotundata (Sowerby III, 1894)
 Monilea semireticulata Suter, 1908: synonym of  Minolia semireticulata (Suter, 1908) 
 Monilea singaporensis  : synonym of  Minolia singaporensis (Pilsbry, 1889)
 Monilea spuria Gould, 1861: synonym of Cinysca spuria (Gould, 1861)
 Monilea vernicosa Gould, 1861: synonym of Sericominolia vernicosa (Gould, 1861)
 Monilea zealandica Hutton, 1873: synonym of Antisolarium egenum (Gould, 1849)

References
Notes

Bibliography
 Dautzenberg, Ph. (1929). Mollusques testacés marins de Madagascar. Faune des Colonies Francaises, Tome III
 Iredale, T. (1929). Queensland molluscan notes, No. 1. Memoirs of the Queensland Museum. 9 : 261-297, pl. 30-31.
 Iredale, T. & McMichael, D.F. (1962). A reference list of the marine Mollusca of New South Wales. Memoirs of the Australian Museum. 11 
 Wilson, B., 1993. Australian Marine Shells. Prosobranch Gastropods. Odyssey Publishing, Kallaroo, WA
 Williams S.T., Karube S. & Ozawa T. (2008) Molecular systematics of Vetigastropoda: Trochidae, Turbinidae and Trochoidea redefined. Zoologica Scripta 37: 483–506

 
Gastropod genera